Sydney Walter Austin (16 November 1866 – 9 September 1932) was an Australian cricketer. He played eight first-class matches for New South Wales between April 1893 and February 1894.

Biography
Austin was described as a "veritable W.G." in junior cricket due to his physique and performances. However, he played for the minor club Clyde in Moore Park cricket, and while he was often offered a place by clubs in higher standard competitions he remained loyal to his club. It was suggested this prevented him from potentially representing Australia. He was a slow bowler who generally bowled breaks from the leg on a good length; he also performed well with the bat at times.

In 1891 Austin was selected for a New South Wales junior side which played Victoria and he scored so well that it caused confusion as to why he was not already playing senior cricket. He finally joined a senior cricket team in 1894 when he joined Waverley and he took the most first grade wickets in the 1895–96 and 1897–98 seasons.

All but one match of his first-class career came on New South Wales's tour of New Zealand in 1893–94, when he took 52 wickets in seven matches with his leg-spin, including 8 for 14 against Hawke's Bay. In the 160-run victory over New Zealand he opened the bowling and bowled unchanged throughout, taking 7 for 63 and 6 for 35, as well as top-scoring in New South Wales's first innings with 43.

In 1896, Austin was selected in the New South Wales side to play in the Sheffield Shield interstate games; however, he declined due to a family bereavement. By 1899, he was no longer an active cricketer. In his career Austin worked in the New South Wales Auditor-General's Department for 43 years. He died in 1932 and was survived by his wife and a son.

See also
 List of New South Wales representative cricketers

References

External links
 

1866 births
1932 deaths
Australian cricketers
New South Wales cricketers
Cricketers from Sydney